Lukas Sandell (born 3 February 1997) is a Swedish handball player for Aalborg Håndbold and the Swedish national team.

Achievements 
 EHF Champions League
 Runner-up: 2021
IHF Super Globe
Bronze medal: 2021
Danish Handball League
Winner: 2021
 Runner-up: 2022
Danish Handball Cup:
Winner: 2021
 Runner-up: 2020
Danish Super Cup
Winner: 2020, 2021, 2022
Norwegian League
Winner: 2019, 2020
Norwegian Cup
Winner: 2018, 2019

References

Swedish male handball players
1997 births
Living people
Aalborg Håndbold players
Handball players at the 2020 Summer Olympics
Olympic handball players of Sweden
21st-century Swedish people